Castle Carrock is a civil parish in the Carlisle district of Cumbria, England.  It contains 14 listed buildings that are recorded in the National Heritage List for England.  All the listed buildings are designated at Grade II, the lowest of the three grades, which is applied to "buildings of national importance and special interest".  The parish contains the village of Castle Carrock, and is otherwise rural.  The listed buildings consist of houses, farm buildings, a folly, a village hall, a war memorial, and a church.


Buildings

References

Citations

Sources

Lists of listed buildings in Cumbria